Orange Creek is a rural locality in the Shire of Banana, Queensland, Australia.

History 
Coreen State School opened on 23 August 1933 and closed in 1951. It was on Prospect Creek Goovigen Road (approx ). It takes its name from the local parish name.

Greycliffe State School opened on 11 November 1935. It closed on 17 December 1993. It was on the corner of Belldeen Greycliffe Road and Prospect Creek Goovigen Road, now within Orange Creek.

Education 
There are no schools in Orange Creek. The nearest government primary schools are Prospect Creek State School in neighbouring Prospect to the south, Biloela State School in Biloela to the south-east, and Jambin State School in neighbouring Jambin to the north-east. The nearest government secondary school is Biloela State High School in Biloela.

References 

Shire of Banana
Localities in Queensland